Jack White (14 June 1912 – 6 January 1982) was an  Australian rules footballer who played with Hawthorn in the Victorian Football League (VFL).

Notes

External links 

1912 births
1982 deaths
Australian rules footballers from Victoria (Australia)
Hawthorn Football Club players